Kotipa is a rural municipality in Ihorombe Region in central Madagascar.

References

Populated places in Ihorombe